Belait, or Lemeting, is a Malayo-Polynesian language of Brunei and neighbouring Malaysia. It is spoken by the Belait people who mainly reside in the Bruneian Belait District. There were estimated to be 700 speakers in 1995.

Classification 
Belait is related to the Miri, Kiput and Narum languages of Sarawak. It is considered part of the Lower Baram subgroup of North Sarawak languages.

Dialects 
There are four mutually-intelligible dialects of Belait. These are spoken in two main regions: 
 In the villages of Kuala Balai and Labi
 In the Kiudang subdistrict of Tutong
Two distinct dialects of Belait – Metting and Bong – are spoken within the Mungkom village, Kiudang. There are very few speakers of any of the dialects.

Phonology 
General references on Belait phonology include Martin (1990) on Metteng Belait and Noor Alifah Abdullah (1992) on Labi Belait. This sketch is based on the Metteng dialect (Clynes 2005). Other dialects may vary in their phonology and lexicon.

Consonants

Vowels 
Metteng Belait has five monophthong vowels . There is one diphthong .

Syllable Structure 
Lexical roots are disyllabic. Final syllables are typically (C)V((C)C). Non-final are typically ((C)C)V(C).

Grammar

Word classes 
The major word classes in Belait are verbs and nouns. The two classes can be distinguished by their distribution, form and function. For example, verbs are negated with the form  and nouns with the form :

There are also several closed functional classes:
 Pronouns
 Prepositions
 Classifiers
 Numerals
 Modals and aspectuals
 Deictics (including demonstratives)

Basic clause structure 
Belait is head-initial. This means that head nouns precede possessors and other modifiers. They also precede relative clauses. Most clauses consist of a predicate and a subject. The subject can either follow or precede the predicate. Hence, word order is flexible.

Predicates can be Verb Phrases (VP), Noun Phrases (NP) or a Prepositional Phrase (PP). Non-subject arguments of a verbal predicate occur immediately after the verb.

Verbal Predicates 
The head of a verbal predicate is the verb. There are two main types of verbs in Belait: intransitive and transitive. Intransitive verbs only have a single subject argument. They do not have any voice morphology on the verb. In contrast, transitive verbs occur in two different voices: Actor Voice (AV) and Undergoer Voice (UV). The two constructions are illustrated below:

AV:actor voice
UV:undergoer voice

In the AV construction in (5) the subject is the Actor, i.e.  'the people before'. In the UV construction in (6) the subject in the Undergoer, i.e.  'durian'. In both cases, the subject comes before the predicate. The undergoer voice typically has perfective semantics. The actor voice tends to be used in other contexts.

References

Berawan–Lower Baram languages
Languages of Brunei
Languages of Malaysia
Endangered Austronesian languages